Jeffrey Andrews may refer to:

Jeff Andrews (born 1959), American baseball player and coach
Jeff Michael Andrews (born 1960), jazz musician
Jeff Andrews, character played by Scott Brady in I Was a Shoplifter
Jeffrey Andrews, character played by Chester Morris in Blind Spot

See also
Geoffrey Andrews (disambiguation)